Gelioya  is a town located in Udunuwara Divisional Secretariat, Kandy District, Central Province, Sri Lanka.

See also
List of towns in Central Province, Sri Lanka

External links

Populated places in Kandy District